Gariadhar is a city and a municipality in Bhavnagar district  in the state of Gujarat, India.

Geography
It has an average elevation of 83 metres (272 feet).

Demographics
 India census, Gariadhar had a population of 30,520. Males constitute 52% of the population and females 48%. Gariadhar has an average literacy rate of 65%, higher than the national average of 59.5%: male literacy is 73%, and female literacy is 56%. In Gariadhar, 15% of the population is under 6 years of age.

Its food gathiya and kali કળી is a very famous product in Gujarat.

People from Gariadhar
Gariadhar is famous for being the home town the saint Valamram,  disciple of Bhoja Bhagat, whose ashram and samadhi is located here.

References

Cities and towns in Bhavnagar district